Wanping Subdistrict, formerly known as Wanpingcheng Area, is a subdistrict in the northern part of Fengtai District, Beijing, China. It borders Lugu Subdistrict to the north, Lugouqiao Subdistrict and Huaxiang Township to the east, Huangcun Township to the south, Changyang Town and Changxindian Town to the west. The subdistrict had  a population of 46,208 as of the 2020 census.

The name of the subdistrict came from Wanping, an old city that was first created around here in 1637.

History

Administrative Division 
Until 2021, 13 subdivision constituted the Wanping Subdistrict, including 10 communities and 3 villages:

Landmark 
 Wanping Fortress
 Museum of the War of Chinese People's Resistance Against Japanese Aggression

See also 
 List of township-level divisions of Beijing

References 

Fengtai District
Subdistricts of Beijing